Acragas erythraeus is a species of jumping spider in the genus Acragas. The scientific name of this species was first published in 1900 by Simon. These spiders are found in Brazil.

References

External links 

erythraeus
Spiders of Brazil
Spiders described in 1900